Phyllonorycter mildredae is a moth of the family Gracillariidae. It is probably widespread through the eastern United States but currently reported from only Washington D.C., Kentucky and Ohio.

The length of the forewings is 2.4–3 mm. Adults are on wing from April to early May, July and September. There is probably one generation per year with the adults overwintering.

The larvae feed on Populus alba, Populus canescens,  Populus grandidentatum and Salix species. They mine the leaves of their host plant. They create a relatively small, lower side, tentiform blotch. It is rather inconspicuous ventrally because of the tomentosity of the host plant.

Etymology
The specific name is derived from the Greek erugo (smooth, clear of wrinkles), in reference to the smooth, apical process of the male valvae.

References

mildredae
Moths of North America
Moths described in 2001